A partial solar eclipse will occur on Wednesday, July 1, 2076. A solar eclipse occurs when the Moon passes between Earth and the Sun, thereby totally or partly obscuring the image of the Sun for a viewer on Earth. A partial solar eclipse occurs in the polar regions of the Earth when the center of the Moon's shadow misses the Earth.

Related eclipses

Solar eclipses 2073–2076

Metonic series

References

External links 

2076 in science
2076 7 1
2076 7 1